Albert Torres Barceló (born 26 April 1990) is a Spanish track and road racing cyclist, who currently rides for UCI WorldTeam . Torres turned professional in 2014 with Team Ecuador. In October 2020, he was named in the startlist for the 2020 Giro d'Italia.

Major results

Road

2010
 1st  Road race, National Under–23 Championships
2016
 5th Trofeo Playa de Palma
 10th Trofeo Felanitx–Ses Salines–Campos–Porreres
2017
 5th Vuelta a La Rioja
2018
 6th Trofeo Palma

Grand Tour general classification results timeline

Track

2007
 3rd  Individual pursuit, UEC European Junior Championships
2008
 UEC European Junior Championships
1st  Individual pursuit
2nd  Points race
2013
 2nd  Madison (with David Muntaner), UCI World Championships
 2nd  Madison (with David Muntaner), UEC European Championships
2014
 1st  Madison (with David Muntaner), UCI World Championships
2015
 1st  Madison (with Sebastián Mora), UEC European Championships
 2nd  Scratch race, UCI World Championships
2016
 UEC European Championships
1st  Omnium
1st  Madison (with Sebastián Mora)
 1st Madison (with Sebastián Mora), UCI World Cup, Glasgow
 1st Six Days of Rotterdam (with Sebastián Mora)
2017
 1st  Omnium, UEC European Championships
2020
 1st  Madison (with Sebastián Mora), UEC European Championships
2023
 2nd  Points race,  UEC European Championships

References

External links
 
 
 
 
 
 

Spanish male cyclists
Sportspeople from Menorca
1990 births
Living people
Olympic cyclists of Spain
Cyclists at the 2012 Summer Olympics
Cyclists at the 2020 Summer Olympics
UCI Track Cycling World Champions (men)
Spanish track cyclists
People from Ciutadella de Menorca
Cyclists from the Balearic Islands